Julius Excluded from Heaven (IE) is a dialogue that was written in 1514, commonly attributed to the Dutch humanist and theologian Desiderius Erasmus. It involves Pope Julius II, who had recently died, trying to persuade Saint Peter to allow him to enter Heaven by using the same tactics he applied when alive. The dialogue is also supplemented by a "Genius" (his guardian angel) who makes wry comments about the pope and his deeds.

Plot
The dialogue begins with a drunken Pope Julius II trying to open the gate of heaven with the key to his secret money-chest. He is accompanied by his Genius, his guardian angel. Behind him are the soldiers who died in his military campaigns, whom he promised would go to heaven regardless of their deeds. Peter denies him passage, even when Julius threatens him with his army and papal bulls of excommunication, and questions him about his deeds on Earth. Julius then goes into a lengthy explanation of his deeds and justifies his sins, ranging from simony to pederasty, with the fact that the pope has the authority to excuse any sin. Peter is disgusted by his description and turns him away. The dialogue ends with Julius planning to muster an army to create his own paradise and capture Heaven.

Authorship
Erasmus is usually credited as the author of the dialogue. It is assumed that a first draft of the IE was provided to Thomas Lupset by Erasmus in summer 1514. Lupset then left for Rome with the IE, where Ulrich von Hutten got hold of the IE and copied it. In a letter of 1519, Erasmus admitted to Cardinal Lorenzo Campeggio that he was in possession of the IE five years ago, which would mean at the time of the earliest knowledge of it. He sometimes implied that he did not write it, but modern scholarship generally overrides this with internal evidence, lack of a credible alternative author when the copies of Bonifacius Amerbach of 1516 and one of von Hutten are examined against each other. Thomas More writes in a letter on 15 December 1516 that he has gotten hold of a copy of the dialogue in Erasmus' handwriting, and asks Erasmus what to do with it.  It is thought that Erasmus made evasive comments to avoid losing allies and to avoid retribution from his enemies and the Inquisition. A more logical conclusion, however, is that he denied authorship because it would be equated to a slap in the face to his patron Pope Leo X, who legitimized Erasmus's birth by means of papal dispensation in 1517.  

Still, the dialogue was very popular and was reprinted many times in pamphlets. It was praised by Martin Luther to be "so learned, and so ingenious, that is, so entirely Erasmian, that it makes the reader laugh at the vices of the church, over which every true Christian ought rather to groan." 

It is very apparent, however, that Erasmus highly disliked Julius II because he felt he did not embody the characteristics of a vicar of Christ. He was shocked by Julius II's personal leadership of armies in full armour and what he felt was the work of a worldly, unscrupulous and ambitious man. These thoughts were clearly implied in his more famous satirical work, The Praise of Folly. A fierce spat over its authorship arose when Ulrich von Hutten, one of the promoters of Erasmus authorship, visited Basel in winter 1523 and Erasmus, refused to receive him for six weeks. He appealed to the conscience of his former friend, but to no avail.

Editions 
Ulrich von Hutten is described as one of the main promoters of Erasmus authorship and also to be responsible for the print of its first edition in 1517. According to Helmut Claus, Peter Schöffer the Youngers printshop was the location of its print, but Schöffer omitted both his name and the printshops location.

References

External links
Northern Renaissance and the background of the Reformation - Erasmus
Google Books - Perspectives on Western Art by Linnea Holmer Wren, Janine M. Carter, David J. Wren
Julius excluded from heaven (1514)

1514 books
16th-century Christian texts
Angels in popular culture
Books by Desiderius Erasmus
Dialogues
Dutch literature
Heaven in popular culture
Saint Peter
Pope Julius II
Satirical works
Works about religious leaders
16th-century Latin books